The 1958 Central Michigan Chippewas football team represented Central Michigan College, renamed Central Michigan University in 1959, in the Interstate Intercollegiate Athletic Conference (IIAC) during the 1958 NCAA College Division football season.  In their eighth season under head coach Kenneth Kelly, the Chippewas compiled a 7–3 record (4–2 against IIAC opponents) and outscored their opponents by a combined total of 216 to 204.

The team's statistical leaders included Oarie Lemanski with 455 passing yards and Walter Beach with 929 rushing yards and 264 receiving yards. Beach received the team's most valuable player award for the first of two consecutive years, and he was also named most valuable player in the IIAC. Five Central Michigan players (Beach, defensive end Don Beemer, defensive back Al Bernardi, defensive tackle Gene Knoblach, and guard Jerry Sieracki) received first-team honors on the All-IIAC team.

Schedule

References

Central Michigan
Central Michigan Chippewas football seasons
Central Michigan Chippewas football